Sergei Vasilyevich Vinogradov (born 19 August 1971) is a former Russian football player.

References

1971 births
Living people
Soviet footballers
FC Energiya Volzhsky players
Russian footballers
FC Rotor Volgograd players
Russian Premier League players
FC Mordovia Saransk players
FC Olimpia Volgograd players
FC Tekstilshchik Kamyshin players

Association football defenders